The shrikebills are the monarch flycatcher genus Clytorhynchus. The five species have long laterally compressed bills similar to true shrikes that give them their names. The genus is endemic to the islands of Melanesia and western Polynesia.

The shrikebills are insectivorous, and use their large heavy bills to explore tangles of dead leaves and dead wood; an unusual foraging strategy for their family. Their diet may also include small fruits and lizards.

Taxonomy and systematics

Extant species
The genus Clytorhynchus contains the following species:
 Southern shrikebill (Clytorhynchus pachycephaloides)
 Fiji shrikebill (Clytorhynchus vitiensis)
 Black-throated shrikebill (Clytorhynchus nigrogularis)
 Santa Cruz shrikebill (Clytorhynchus sanctaecrucis)
 Rennell shrikebill (Clytorhynchus hamlini)

Former species
Formerly, some authorities also considered the following species (or subspecies) as species within the genus Clytorhynchus:
Sangihe whistler (as Pinarolestes sanghirensis)
Little shrikethrush (as Pinarolestes megarhynchos or Pinarolestes megarhynchus)

References

 
 
Taxonomy articles created by Polbot